Leitgeb is a German surname. Notable people with the surname include:

Christoph Leitgeb (born 1985), Austrian footballer
 Hannes Leitgeb (born 1972), Austrian philosopher and mathematician
Hubert Leitgeb (biathlete) (1965–2012), Italian biathlete
Hubert Leitgeb (botanist), (1835–1888), Austrian botanist
Mario Leitgeb (born 1988), Austrian footballer

German-language surnames